Biosurfactant usually refers to surfactants of microbial origin. Most of the biosurfactants produced by microbes are synthesized extracellularly and many microbes are known to produce biosurfactants in large relative quantities. Some are of commercial interest. As a secondary metabolite of microorganisms, biosurfactants can be processed by the cultivation of biosurfactant producing microorganisms in the stationary phase on many sorts of low-priced substrates like biochar, plant oils, carbohydrates, wastes, etc. High-level production of biosurfactants can be controlled by regulation of environmental factors and growth circumstances.

Classification 
Biosurfactants are usually categorized by their molecular structure. Like synthetic surfactants, they are composed of a hydrophilic moiety made up of amino acids, peptides, (poly)saccharides, or sugar alcohols and a hydrophobic moiety consisting of fatty acids. Correspondingly, the significant classes of biosurfactants include glycolipids, lipopeptides and lipoproteins, and polymeric surfactants as well as particulate surfactants.

Examples

Common biosurfactants include:
 Bile salts are mixtures of micelle-forming compounds that encapsulate food, enabling absorption through the small intestine.
 Lecithin, which can be obtained either from soybean or from egg yolk, is a common food ingredient.
 Rhamnolipids, which can be produced by some species of Pseudomonas, e.g., Pseudomonas aeruginosa.
 Sophorolipids are produced by various nonpathogenic yeasts.
 Emulsan produced by Acinetobacter calcoaceticus.

Microbial biosurfactants are obtained by including immiscible liquids in the growth medium.

Applications
Potential applications include herbicides and pesticides formulations, detergents, healthcare and cosmetics, pulp and paper, coal, textiles, ceramic processing and food industries, uranium ore-processing, and mechanical dewatering of peat.

Oil spill remediation
Biosurfactants enhance the emulsification of hydrocarbons, thus they have the potential to solubilise hydrocarbon contaminants and increase their availability for microbial degradation. These compounds can also be used in enhanced oil recovery and may be considered for other potential applications in environmental protection.

References

External links 

 Production and Characterization of Biosurfactants Using Bacteria Isolated from Acidic Hot Springs

Surfactants
Bioremediation
Cleaning product components
Environmental terminology